Robert Edward Reed (born January 12, 1945) is a former Major League Baseball pitcher.

External links

1945 births
Living people
Baseball players from Massachusetts
Detroit Tigers players
Major League Baseball pitchers